Kadir Ari (born 27 November 1994) is a Turkish football midfielder who plays for İskenderunspor.

External links
 
 
 
 

1994 births
People from Nazilli
Living people
Turkish footballers
Turkey youth international footballers
Association football wingers
Beşiktaş J.K. footballers
Turgutluspor footballers
Manisa FK footballers
Hacettepe S.K. footballers
Gümüşhanespor footballers
Utaş Uşakspor footballers
Sakaryaspor footballers
24 Erzincanspor footballers
Süper Lig players
TFF Second League players
TFF Third League players